John Allen Livingston (November 10, 1923 – January 17, 2006) was a Canadian naturalist, broadcaster, author, and teacher. He was most known as the voice-over of the Hinterland Who's Who series of television zoological shorts in the 1960s.

Born in Hamilton, Ontario, he enlisted in the Royal Canadian Navy at the beginning of World War II and earned a degree in English literature in 1943 while on active service. He joined the Audubon Society of Canada in 1955 as managing director and editor of its newsletter. He later became head of the science unit at the Canadian Broadcasting Corporation (CBC), most notably serving as the first executive producer of the long-running documentary series The Nature of Things. He left the CBC in 1968, but remained an occasional contributor of documentary films to The Nature of Things, most notably the Canadian Film Award-winning Wild Africa in 1970. He then formed LDL: Environmental Research Associates, an environmental consulting company, with Aird Lewis and Bill Gunn of the Nature Conservancy of Canada; the firm became most noted for their work on the Mackenzie Valley Pipeline Inquiry.

Livingston was the author of several books, including The Fallacy of Wildlife Conservation (1981) and the Governor General's Award-winning Rogue Primate (1994). In his later years, he was a professor emeritus of environmental studies at York University.

Selected bibliography
Darwin and the Galapagos (1966) (with Lister Sinclair)
Birds of the Northern Forest (1966) (with J. F. Lansdowne)
Arctic Oil (1981)
The Fallacy of Wildlife Conservation (1981)
Canada: A Natural History (1988)
Rogue Primate: An Exploration of Human Domestication (1994)
One Cosmic Instant (1968)

References

1923 births
2006 deaths
20th-century Canadian non-fiction writers
20th-century Canadian male writers
Canadian television personalities
Canadian television producers
Canadian nature writers
Canadian naturalists
Canadian environmentalists
Canadian male non-fiction writers
Canadian people of British descent
Writers from Hamilton, Ontario
Governor General's Award-winning non-fiction writers
Canadian Screen Award winners
Canadian documentary film directors
Film directors from Ontario
Directors of Genie and Canadian Screen Award winners for Best Documentary Film
Academic staff of York University
Royal Canadian Navy personnel of World War II